Sebastes levis, the cowcod or cow rockfish, is a species of marine ray-finned fish belonging to the subfamily Sebastinae, the rockfishes, part of the family Scorpaenidae. It is found in the eastern Pacific Ocean.

Taxonomy
Sebastes levis was first was first formally described in 1878 by the American ichthyologists Carl H. Eigenmann and Rosa Smith Eigenmann with the type locality given as the Cortes Bank off San Diego, California. Some authorities classify this species in the subgenus Hispaniscus. The specific name levis means “light” or “mild”, the Eigenmanns did not explain this allusion, it may refer to the pink, occasionally, pale-orange color of adults i.e not red. Alternatively, as suggested by Jordan and Evermann in 1898, the name may mean “capricious or fantastic”, this suggestion was not explained but may refer to the rapid colour changes this species can perform.

Description
Sebastes levis has a deep and compressed body, the body’s depth is between a third and two fifths of its standard length. They have a large head, small eyes and a large mouth with a lower jaw which juts out. The head is armed with many spines. There are 13 to 14 spines and 12 to 13 soft rays in the dorsal fin and 3 spines and 6 or 7 soft rays in the anal fin. The membranes of the dorsal fin are deeply incised. Adult cowcod vare variable in color and may be cream, pink, salmon, orange or gold. Some may have indistinct dark or red barring. The juveniles are marked with gold or brown bars on a background color of whitish or pale yellow. The juveniles are very similar to the barred juveniles of some other species of rockfish.

Distribution and habitat
Sebastes levis is found in the eastern Pacific Ocean where it occurs from Guerrero Negro in Baja California Sur north to Usal, Mendocino County in central California.

Biology
Sebastes levis is an ambush predator in the deep waters over the continental shelf and upper slope, their prey mainly consisting of benthic crabs, octopus, shrimp, and small fish. They are solitary and territorial as adults. The females produce eggs in their ovaries from November to May, the larger individuals are able to produce as many as 1,925,000 eggs in a season.

Conservation
Overfishing of cowcod in the 1970s and 1980s is estimated to have led to a steep decline in abundance to a low point of 9% of unfished biomass in 1989. The stock was declared overfished in 2000 and retention of cowcod was prohibited from January 2001 until January 2011. From 2011 onward, a small quota was allocated to the trawl fishery but retention remained prohibited in all other sectors. The initial rebuilding plan estimated that the recovery would take decades, but a stock assessment conducted in 2019 estimated the stock had recovered to 57% of the unfished biomass and the stock was declared to have been rebuilt.

The California Department of Fish and Wildlife closed 4,300 square nautical miles off southern California to all bottomfishing as a cowcod conservation area, and prohibited all cowcod catch.

References

External links
 Sebastes levis Fishbase

levis
Taxa named by Rosa Smith Eigenmann
Taxa named by Carl H. Eigenmann
Fish described in 1889